Claridon is an unincorporated community in Marion County, Ohio, United States. The community is served by River Valley Local School District.

History
Claridon was laid out in 1821. The young community was once a contender for the county seat. A post office called Claridon was established in 1822, and remained in operation until about 1831. Some confusion exists about the date of the establishment of the post office because there existed a Claridon in Geagua County (which opened its post office in 1819, a year before Marion County was even opened to settlement). The first postmaster was Bisby Kilbourn(e). Besides the post office, Claridon had a tavern and a country store.

References

Unincorporated communities in Marion County, Ohio
Unincorporated communities in Ohio